The Passion Flower Hotel is a novel by Rosalind Erskine (real name Roger Erskine Longrigg). It was published by Jonathan Cape in 1962. The story concerns a young girl going to an English girls' boarding school. In the dormitory, the girls discuss losing their virginity and decide that the best way is to set up a "service" for the local boys' school situated across the lake from them. The subject is treated in a light manner.

A sequel, Passion Flowers in Italy, was published by Simon & Schuster in 1964.

Stage adaptation 
It was adapted into a musical with music by John Barry, lyrics by Trevor Peacock and a book by Wolf Mankowitz. It was produced by Gene Gutowski, premiered at the Palace Theatre, Manchester, England, on 30 July 1965, transferring to the Prince of Wales Theatre, London, on 24 August 1965, and ran for 148 performances. The cast included Francesca Annis and Jeremy Clyde, as well as future stars such as Michael Cashman, Pauline Collins, Bill Kenwright, Nicky Henson, Hilary Dwyer, and Barry's future wife Jane Birkin.

Film adaptation 
A film loosely based on the story was made in 1978 in German under the title of Leidenschaftliche Blümchen starring Nastassja Kinski.  A dubbed version was released in English under the title Passion Flower Hotel.

References 

 Kurt Ganzl: The British Musical Theatre

West End musicals
1962 British novels
1965 musicals
Jonathan Cape books
British musicals
British novels adapted into films
Works published under a pseudonym
Novels set in boarding schools
Prostitution in England
Works about virginity
Novels about British prostitution